The 2019 VTV Awards (Vietnamese: Ấn tượng VTV - Thách thức 2019) is a ceremony honouring the outstanding achievement in television on the Vietnam Television (VTV) network from August 2018 to July 2019. It took place on September 7, 2019 in Hanoi and hosted by Thành Trung, Ngô Kiến Huy & Minh Hà.

Winners and nominees
(Winners denoted in bold)

Presenters/Awarders

Special performances

References

External links

List of television programmes broadcast by Vietnam Television (VTV)

2019 television awards
VTV Awards
2019 in Vietnamese television
September 2019 events in Vietnam